Heroes in Hell is an anthology book and the first volume of its namesake series, created by American writer Janet Morris. The book placed eighth in the annual Locus Poll for Best Anthology in 1987. "Newton Sleep" by Gregory Benford, originally published in The Magazine of Fantasy and Science Fiction, received a Nebula Award nomination in 1986, as well as placing 16th in its category in the Locus Poll.

Contents
In order of presentation, the anthology contains:

 "Son of the Morning" by Chris Morris
 "Newton Sleep" by Gregory Benford – originally published in The Magazine of Fantasy & Science Fiction in 1985; nominated Nebula Award Best Novella 1986 
 "The Prince" by C. J. Cherryh – originally published in Far Frontiers Vol. 4
 "A Walk in the Park" by Nancy Asire
 "The Hand of Providence" by David Drake
 "Basileus" by C. J. Cherryh and Janet Morris - originally published as a "special bonus" in the 1985 Baen Books paperback edition of Rhialto the Marvellous
 "To Reign in Hell" by Janet Morris

Reception
Reviewer Chuq von Rospach declared "The concept is silly," going on to say that "the plots are for the most part banal, and the characters are unsympathetic.  The writing is simplistic and the continuity is questionable.  In other words, they borrowed all of the worst parts of Thieves' World and forgot to include what makes it worthwhile." The Encyclopedia of Hell states "Author Janet Morris created a unique underworld saga in her 1984 book, Heroes in Hell, a witty novel that declares 'Nobody who is anybody went to heaven.'...[it] weaves myth, legend, fact, and fantasy into a fascinating tapestry of underworld lore."

References
 

1986 anthologies
Bangsian fantasy
Fantasy books by series
Fantasy anthologies
Literary collaborations
Baen Books books
Janet Morris
Short stories by C. J. Cherryh